Sir Matthew White Ridley, 2nd Baronet (28 October 1745 – 9 April 1813), was a Northumbrian landowner and politician who sat in the House of Commons between 1768 and 1812.

Life
He was the son of Matthew Ridley (1716–1778) (Governor of the Newcastle-upon-Tyne Company of Merchant Adventurers, four times Mayor of and five times Member of Parliament for Newcastle) and Elizabeth White (1721–1764), daughter of Matthew White, a prominent Newcastle merchant of Blagdon Hall, Stannington, Northumberland, and sister of Sir Matthew White, 1st Baronet, of Blagdon. He succeeded to the baronetcy of Blagdon and to the estate at Blagdon Hall on the death of his uncle in 1763.

He followed his father as Governor of the Company of Merchant Adventurers.

He was appointed Chief Magistrate for Newcastle on three occasions, and was elected Mayor of the city three times, in 1774, 1782 and 1791. He served as Member of Parliament (MP) for Morpeth 1768–1774 and Newcastle 1774–1812.

A monument to his memory stands in the nave of St Nicholas' Cathedral, Newcastle. Ridley is depicted in full length life size dressed in a Roman toga. The inscription gives details of his service to the community.

Family
Ridley married Sarah Colborne, daughter of Benjamin Colborne of Bath, in 1777; they had five sons and one daughter:

Sir Matthew White Ridley, 3rd Baronet (18 Apr 1778 – 14 July 1836)
Nicholas Ridley-Colborne, 1st Baron Colborne (14 Apr 1779 – 3 May 1854)
Rev. Henry Colborne (14 May 1780 – 3 Feb 1832) married Mary Farrer, daughter of James William Farrer. They had three sons, and a daughter.
Henrietta Elizabeth (1781 – 10 Oct 1853) married twice. Firstly to the Hon. John Scott, son of John Scott, 1st Earl of Eldon, on 22 August 1804. After his death she married secondly her brother's in-law, James William Farrer, son of James Farrer, on 6 July 1811. She had one son with Scott, and three sons and a daughter with Farrer.
Rev. Richard (28 July 1782 – 21 Jan 1845) married Catherine Lucy Johnson, daughter of Rev. Richard Popplewell Johnson, on 8 November 1810. They had no known issue.
Rev. Charles John (b. 5 Sep 1792)
 
His third son, Henry, and grandson William Henry Ridley were both Rectors of Hambleden, Bucks.

His great grandson, the 5th Baronet, was created Viscount Ridley in 1900.

References

 
   The Peerage website

1745 births
1813 deaths
People from Stannington, Northumberland
Ridley, Matthew, 2nd Baronet
Members of the Parliament of Great Britain for English constituencies
British MPs 1768–1774
British MPs 1774–1780
British MPs 1780–1784
British MPs 1784–1790
British MPs 1790–1796
British MPs 1796–1800
Members of the Parliament of the United Kingdom for English constituencies
UK MPs 1801–1802
UK MPs 1802–1806
UK MPs 1806–1807
UK MPs 1807–1812
Matthew
Mayors of Newcastle upon Tyne